The Bankruptcy and Insolvency Act (BIA) (the Act) is one of the statutes that regulates the law on bankruptcy and insolvency in Canada. It governs bankruptcies, consumer and commercial proposals, and receiverships in Canada.

It also governs the Office of the Superintendent of Bankruptcy, a federal agency responsible for ensuring that bankruptcies are administered in a fair and orderly manner.

Purpose and scope

The nature of the Act within Canada's legal framework governing insolvency was described by the Supreme Court of Canada in Century Services Inc. v. Canada (Attorney General):

With certain exceptions, the Act covers a wide range of entities:

 it covers anyone who has resided or carried on business in Canada
 it "includes a partnership, an unincorporated association, a corporation, a cooperative society or a cooperative organization, the successors of a partnership, of an association, of a corporation, of a society or of an organization and the heirs, executors, liquidators of the succession, administrators or other legal representatives of a person;" but
 partners in a partnership may be placed into bankruptcy with that partnership, but that can only occur where the partnership is located in one of the common-law jurisdictions; the Civil Code of Quebec defines partnership property as being a patrimony independent from its partners
 it does not apply to banks, insurance companies, trust companies or loan companies.
 The Farm Debt Mediation Act provides that farmers cannot be forced into bankruptcy, but they can make a voluntary assignment.
 The Companies' Creditors Arrangement Act provides that a court may order a stay of proceedings with respect to specified large debtors, whether or not they have already been initiated.

The Act governs bankruptcy proceedings, which are invoked:

 either voluntarily by a person who is insolvent,
 by a debtor's creditors, where the debtor owes at least $1000 and has committed an act of bankruptcy, or
 where a proposal under the Act has failed.

The Act also governs receivership proceedings. Receivers may be appointed by a secured creditor under the terms of a general security agreement (where the debtor voluntarily agrees), or by the court where a secured creditor:

 is enforcing his security, or
 is acting under a court order made under any other federal or provincial statute that authorizes the appointment of a receiver or receiver-manager.

Provision is also made for dealing with cross-border insolvencies and the recognition of foreign proceedings.

Relationship with provincial law
Several notable cases known as the "bankruptcy quartet" stand for the following propositions about how the Act interacts with provincial legislation:

provinces cannot create priorities between creditors or change the scheme of distribution on bankruptcy under s. 136(1) of the Act;
while provincial legislation may validly affect priorities in a non-bankruptcy situation, once bankruptcy has occurred section 136(1) of the Act determines the status and priority of the claims specifically dealt with in that section;
if the provinces could create their own priorities or affect priorities under the Bankruptcy Act this would invite a different scheme of distribution on bankruptcy from province to province, an unacceptable situation; and
the definition of terms such as "secured creditor", if defined under the Bankruptcy Act, must be interpreted in bankruptcy cases as defined by the federal Parliament, not the provincial legislatures. Provinces cannot affect how such terms are defined for purposes of the Act.
in determining the relationship between provincial legislation and the Bankruptcy Act, the form of the provincial interest created must not be allowed to triumph over its substance. The provinces are not entitled to do indirectly what they are prohibited from doing directly.
there need not be any provincial intention to intrude into the exclusive federal sphere of bankruptcy and to conflict with the order of priorities of the Bankruptcy Act in order to render the provincial law inapplicable. It is sufficient that the effect of provincial legislation is to do so.

However, there are instances where provincial law will continue to apply:

 where the insolvent person is one that plainly falls within provincial jurisdiction (such as a municipal institution), a province has authority to compel reorganizations of bodies and debt obligations
 where a stay under federal law has been lifted in order to allow proceedings to take place, a province can still impose a moratorium on proceedings that fall under provincial law

Issues concerning the extent of federal paramountcy continue to come before the Supreme Court of Canada. In the 2015 "paramountcy trilogy," the boundaries were further explored:

 An Alberta Act was held neither to disqualify a person from driving a motor vehicle or to suspend the registration of such vehicles, because of an unsatisfied personal injury debt that had been discharged in bankruptcy.
 An Ontario Act governing the collection of tolls charged by 407 ETR was held not to apply to bar a discharged bankrupt from renewing his license plates upon payment of normal annual fees.
 However, a Saskatchewan Act that required creditors to serve a notice of intention, engage in mandatory mediation, and prove that the debtor has no reasonable possibility of meeting its obligations or is not making a sincere and reasonable effort to meet its obligations before it can begin an action with respect to farm land was held not to be inconsistent with the BIA, as cooperative federalism dictates that provincial legislative power should not be constrained, absent an actual inconsistency.

History and development

Consolidation of pre-Confederation legislation 

No specific legislation on bankruptcy and insolvency previously existed in New Brunswick and Nova Scotia.

Development of federal legislation

Bankruptcy process

Protective provisions

A secured creditor cannot enforce security on the business assets of an insolvent person without having given 10 days' advance notice in the prescribed form and manner.

No person may terminate or amend – or claim an accelerated payment or forfeiture of the term under – any agreement, including a security agreement, with a bankrupt individual by reason only of the individual's bankruptcy or insolvency. Similar provision is made with respect to any insolvent person upon filing a notice of intention or a proposal.

A notice of intention, a Division I proposal, or a Division II proposal, will automatically create a stay of proceedings and "no creditor has any remedy against the debtor or the debtor's property, or shall commence or continue any action, execution or other proceedings, for the recovery of a claim provable in bankruptcy". Similar provision is also made on the bankruptcy of any debtor. Directors of insolvent companies that have filed a notice of intention or a proposal have similar protection.

Suspension of attachments

S. 70(1) of the BIA provides that bankruptcy orders and assignments take precedence over "all judicial or other attachments, garnishments, certificates having the effect of judgments, judgments, certificates of judgment, legal hypothecs of judgment creditors, executions or other process against the property of a bankrupt," but that does not extend to:

 those that have been completely executed by payment to the creditor or the creditor's representative, or
 the rights of a secured creditor.

The Ontario Court of Appeal has ruled that, in the case of a "requirement to pay" under the Income Tax Act (Canada) that was issued after a notice of application to appoint a receiver (but before the court heard the application), supported by an ex parte "jeopardy order" issued by the Federal Court of Canada under s. 225.1(1) of that Act, the "requirement to pay" was considered to have been completely executed on the date of its issue, and thus took precedence over other creditors' claims.

Settlement of the insolvent person's estate

The trustee/receiver must first realize the amount of the proceeds from the property that is available for payment to the different classes of creditors, and different rules apply according to the type of proceeding. They are summarized as follows:

The estate is then settled, using the priority of claims outlined in the BIA.

The BIA'''s definition of property is quite broad:

As a consequence, the Supreme Court of Canada has ruled that direct payment clauses in contracts (allowing contractors to make payments to creditors of a bankrupt subcontractor) do not release the contractor from its obligations to the trustee of the estate.

Creditors

The resulting amount available from the estate is distributed to the creditors in the following order of priority (with each class/subclass paid in full before proceeding to the next):

There are several important notes to consider in assessing the above priorities:

 claims may include amounts that would have been statute-barred prior to the bankruptcy
 all claims in each class are paid rateably
 receivership and CCAA proceedings may proceed directly into bankruptcy proceedings after the super-priority and secured creditors have been settled in full, in order to vary the priority in which certain other items must be settled
 participation in the claims process does not preclude any other remedies creditors may have available. For example, guarantees may be called, with the guarantors having the subsequent right to make a claim against the estate for the amounts they were required to pay. Guarantees can normally be demanded by suppliers from officers and directors, and parent company guarantees are also common. Financial institutions, in order to fully realize on secured obligations of a debtor, will normally require guarantors to execute a "Guarantee and Postponement of Claim", which prevents the guarantor from filing a claim against the estate until the secured creditor has been paid in full.

Every creditor must prove his claim and a creditor who does not prove his claim is not entitled to any distribution of the proceeds from bankrupt's estate. The claim must be delivered to the trustee in bankruptcy and the trustee in bankruptcy must examine every proof of claim and can request further proof. The trustee may disallow, in whole or in part, any claim of right to a priority under the BIA or security. Generally, the test of proving the claim before the trustee in bankruptcy is very low, and a claim is proved unless it is too "remote and speculative". The rationale for such a low test is to discharge as many claims as possible to allow the bankrupt to make a fresh start after the discharge.

Creditors also have the ability, with the approval of the court,  to take over a cause of action that the trustee has decided not to pursue.

Effect of discharge
Discharge does not extinguish claims that are provable in bankruptcy. It releases the debtor from such claims, and creditors cease to be able to enforce them.

Some liabilities are not released upon discharge, including:

any fine, penalty, restitution or similar order imposed by a court,
any award of damages by a court in civil proceedings arising from bodily harm, sexual assault or wrongful death,
any debt or liability for alimony or alimentary pension,
any debt or liability arising under a judicial decision or agreement relating to maintenance or support,
any debt or liability arising out of fraud, embezzlement, misappropriation or defalcation while acting in a fiduciary capacity,
any debt or liability resulting from obtaining property or services by false pretences or fraudulent misrepresentation (other than one arising from an equity claim),
liability for the dividend that a creditor would have been entitled to receive on any provable claim not disclosed to the trustee (unless the creditor knew of the bankruptcy and failed to take steps to prove his claim),
any student loans where the date of bankruptcy occurs while the bankrupt is a student, or within seven years after ceasing to be so (but relief is available where the bankrupt acted in good faith during the bankruptcy and financial difficulties will continue so that such debt can never be paid off), plus
any interest accrued with respect to any of the above debts.

Directors and parties related to the bankrupt may still be held personally liable for certain tax debts, and, if a clearance certificate is not obtained from the tax authorities prior to discharge, directors' liability will subsequently resume. Directors can also be held accountable for other liabilities arising from bankruptcy, regulatory and other statutory offences.

Preferences and transfers at undervalue

In 2009, the Act was amended to reform the rules relating to setting aside any preferences, or transfers at undervalue, occurring before the initial bankruptcy event:

Recovery actions under ss. 95 and 96, as for other recovery actions with respect to collections, can only be initiated by the trustee, even when they may be of benefit only to a secured creditor (unless creditors seek court approval under s. 38 to pursue the matter directly).

The Act already empowered the court to inquire into circumstances where a bankrupt corporation had paid cash dividends or redeemed shares where the corporation was insolvent, or where the transactions made it so, during the 12 months prior to its bankruptcy. In that regard,

 the directors may be held jointly and severally liable for the amounts in question (unless they prove that they acted in good faith, or individual directors can prove that they had protested such payment)
 shareholders related to any of the directors held liable may also be declared liable for the amount they had received as payment
 existing powers under the applicable incorporating Act allowing the directors to recover such payments are not affected

S. 95(2) provides that, where a preference is given, the fact that it may have been given under pressure is irrelevant. However, the courts have ruled that a payment may withstand challenge by a trustee where it is made in furtherance of a reasonable business imperative., citing 

Key actors in the procedure

 Bankruptcy court 

The provincial Superior Courts have "such jurisdiction at law and in equity" as will enable them to exercise bankruptcy process under the Act. The decisions of the court are enforceable in the courts of other Canadian provinces and all courts and the officers of all courts must act and co-operate in all bankruptcy matters. Appeal from the court's orders lies to the provincial Court of Appeal where:

the point at issue involves future rights;
the order or decision is likely to affect other cases of a similar nature in the bankruptcy proceedings;
the property involved in the appeal exceeds $10,000;
the aggregate unpaid claims of creditors exceed $500 (from the grant of or refusal to grant a discharge); and
in any other case, leave has been granted by a judge of the Court of Appeal (but such appeal is not as of right).

Registrars of the provincial Superior Courts have significant powers in relation to procedural matters, unopposed proceedings and in other matters under the Act.

 Office of the Superintendent of Bankruptcy 

The Office of the Superintendent of Bankruptcy ("OSB") is designed to supervise the administration of all estates and matters to which the Act applies.  It grants licenses for the trustees in bankruptcy, inspects and/or investigates bankruptcy estates, reviews the conduct of the trustees in bankruptcy and the receivers, and examines trustee's accounts, receipts, disbursements and final statements. It has specific powers to intervene in any matter or proceeding in court as if the OSB were a party thereto, as well as to issue directives providing official interpretation of the bankruptcy process to the trustees in bankruptcy and the receivers.

 Licensed Insolvency Trustee 

Trustees  either individuals or corporations  are licensed by the Superintendent, and are appointed to administer an estate by virtue of the assignment, bankruptcy order or proposal that has been filed. By special resolution, the creditors of the estate may appoint or substitute another licensed trustee to assume the role. A trustee is not bound to accept an appointment, but, once appointed, he must perform all duties that are legally required until his discharge or removal. Otherwise, any licensed trustee can be appointed to act, subject to the following constraints:

 where, in the previous two years, the trustee had been a director, officer or employee of the debtor (or related to any such director or officer), or had acted as auditor, accountant or legal counsel for the debtor, the appointment is subject to the court's approval and conditions
 where the trustee was a trustee under a debtor's trust indenture, the court has similar authority
 where the trustee is already the trustee with respect to the bankruptcy or proposal of a person related to the debtor, or is already acting as a receiver with respect to any property of such person, he must make full disclosure of that fact and of the potential conflict of interest on his appointment, as well as at the first meeting of creditors
 the trustee must not act on behalf of a secured creditor without first obtaining independent legal advice that the security is valid and enforceable, and he must notify the Superintendent, creditors and inspectors of that fact
 the court, on the application of an interested person, may remove a trustee for cause and appoint another in his place

The trustee acts as receiver for all the estate's property, and is entitled to see its books and records. All moneys he receives must be deposited into a separate trust account. When required, he is obliged to report on the estate's condition, moneys on hand, and property remaining unsold. He is not obliged to continue the business of the bankrupt, where there is no good business case for doing so. When he has completed the duties required of him for administering the estate, he shall apply to the court for a discharge, but any interested person may file an objection to having the discharge take place.

All property of the bankruptcy vests in the trustee from the date of the bankruptcy, and the trustee may register a bankruptcy order against any real property in which the bankrupt has any interest or estate. The courts have held that trustees should clearly communicate to the bankrupt their intent to make a claim against the non-exempt equity in the bankrupt's property at the time of the assignment into bankruptcy. Failure to do so may result in:

 the trustee being unable to realize any of the non-exempt equity, or
 the absolute discharge of the bankrupt, without requiring him to pay to the estate the price agreed upon for the right to sell the property.

The Superintendent may undertake conservatory measures in order to protect an estate, as well as the rights of the creditors and debtors, in specified circumstances:

 the death, removal or incapacity of the trustee
 an inquiry or investigation into the trustee's conduct
 the trustee's insolvency
 a trustee having been found guilty of an indictable offence
 circumstances where the Superintendent is considering the cancellation of the trustee's license

 Inspectors 

At the first meeting of the creditors, up to five individuals may be appointed to be inspectors of the estate (except where the creditors decide that that is not necessary). No inspector may be appointed if he is a party to any contested action or proceeding against the estate. Where the value of an individual debtor's property is under $15,000, inspectors are not appointed (except where the creditors decide otherwise).

The trustee is required to obtain the  inspectors' permission before carrying out many of his responsibilities, such as the sale of property of the estate, the institution or defending of actions relating to the property of the bankrupt, settling any debts owing to the bankrupt and exercising trustee's discretion in retaining and assigning bankrupt's contracts. The inspectors must give their approval to the final statement of receipts and disbursements and trustee's fees.

Inspectors have a fiduciary duty to the creditors and should be impartial though acting in their interest. They should supervise the trustee's compliance with the Act and the Superintendent's directives, and may apply for the removal of the trustee.

Receivers

The receiver must do what "practicality demands" to preserve the assets  and must not go beyond what is necessary in the circumstances.

 Interim receivers 

The court may appoint an interim receiver:

 at any time after the filing of an application for a bankruptcy order and before a bankruptcy order is made,
 after a secured creditor has filed an advance notice of intention to enforce his security on the debtor's property, or
 at any time after the filing of a notice of intention or of a Division I proposal 

In the first case, the applicant must give an undertaking with respect to the debtor's legal rights, and to damages in the event of the application being dismissed. The interim receiver can take conservatory measures and dispose of perishable property in order to comply with the order of the court, but the receiver cannot otherwise unduly interfere with the bankrupt in the carrying on of the debtor's business.

In the latter two cases, the court can only make the appointment if it is shown that it is necessary for the protection of the debtor's estate, or in the interest of the creditor(s).

The courts have set out the following factors to be considered in exercising discretion on whether to appoint an interim receiver:

 whether the person is in control of the property
 whether the debtor is acting in bad faith and giving preferences to other creditors
 whether the debtor is fraudulently disposing and concealing his assets
 allegations of criminal offenses have been made
 the debtor's property is in the possession of third parties

 See also 

 Commercial insolvency in Canada
 Consumer bankruptcy in Canada
 Insolvency law of Canada

Notes and references
Notes

References

Further reading

 

 External links 

 Bankruptcy and Insolvency Act Winding-Up and Restructuring Act Canada Transportation Act Farm Debt Mediation Act''

Canadian federal legislation
Canadian insolvency legislation